Talakayan Ng Bayan is a Filipino weekday radio show, which airs on DWBL every weekday from 11:00am to 12:00pm.

History

Talakayan Ng Bayan was founded by Bobby Brilliante, the former Vice Mayor of Makati. It featured news and commentary with reports from the Kalayaan Patrol. In 1992 Arvin Malaza joined the program.

In 2007, after the change of hosts, Arvin Malaza hosted the program from March to October 2007.  In October 2007 until January 2008, Bobby Brillante served as the host. In January 2008, Arvin and Bobby reunited and co-hosted the program until October 2008.  In October 2008, Arvin Malaza took over the management of the show and made  Bobby Brillante the sole host of the show.  From October 2008 until the middle of March 2009, it followed a format of reporting the news with additional content from the Kalayaan Patrol.

Ricky Mendoza took over management of the program in late March 2009. At that time, the program was split into two segments: news and commentaries provided by Joy Navarro and other reporters from Ligang Broadcasting in the Philippines.  Occasional stingers were provided by Ricky Mendoza.  This format prevailed until May 2009.  In June 2009 Bobby Brillante returned and revived the program into its current format focused on commentaries with additional reporting from the Kalayaan Patrol.

Philippine radio programs
1988 radio programme debuts